La Diva Aux Pieds Nus is the first album recorded by Cesária Évora.  This was also the first album recorded by the independent label company Lusafrica.  The album sold 3,000 vinyl records, mainly by the Cape Verdean community. The album name is the French name for her nickname the "Barefoot Diva".

Track listing

References

External links
Album at cesaria.info

"iTunes - Music - La diva aux pieds nus by Césaria Évora".  iTunes. retrieved 23 October 2014.

1988 debut albums
Cesária Évora albums